RNA polymerase II elongation factor ELL is an enzyme that in humans is encoded by the ELL gene.

Interactions 

ELL (gene) has been shown to interact with P53.

References

Further reading